Live at Montreux and Northsea is an album by drummer Art Blakey and The Jazz Messengers Big Band recorded in 1980 at the Montreux Jazz Festival in Switzerland (with one track recorded at the North Sea Jazz Festival in the Netherlands) and released on the Dutch Timeless label.

Reception

Scott Yanow, writing for AllMusic called it "a historically significant and rather enjoyable release".

Track listing 
All compositions by Bobby Watson except where noted.
 "Minor Thesis" (James Williams) – 13:17   
 "Wheel Within a Wheel" – 7:02   
 "Bit a Bittadose" – 6:41   
 "Stairway to the Stars" (Matty Malneck, Mitchell Parish, Frank Signorelli) – 8:34   
 "Linwood" – 7:31
Recorded at the North Sea Jazz Festival in The Hague, the Netherlands on July 13, 1980 (track 1) and at the Montreux Jazz Festival in Montreux, Switzerland on July 17, 1980 (tracks 2–5)

Personnel 
Art Blakey, John Ramsay – drums
Valery Ponomarev, Wynton Marsalis – trumpet
Robin Eubanks – trombone
Bobby Watson – alto saxophone
Branford Marsalis – alto saxophone, baritone saxophone
Bill Pierce – tenor saxophone
James Williams – piano
Kevin Eubanks – guitar
Charles Fambrough – bass

References 

Art Blakey live albums
The Jazz Messengers live albums
1981 live albums
Timeless Records live albums